The 2013–14 Oklahoma Sooners women's basketball team will represent the University of Oklahoma in the 2013–14 NCAA Division I women's basketball season. The Sooners are led by Sherri Coale in her eighteenth season. The team will play its home games at the Lloyd Noble Center in Norman, Oklahoma as a member of the Big 12 Conference. They finished the season with a record 18–15 overall, 9–9 in Big 12 for a tie to finish in fifth place. They lost in the quarterfinals of the 2014 Big 12 women's basketball tournament to Texas. They were invited to the 2014 NCAA Division I women's basketball tournament which they lost in the first round to DePaul.

Roster

Schedule
Sources:

|-
! colspan=9 style="background:#FFFDD0; color:#960018;"| Exhibition

|-
! colspan=9 style="background:#960018; color:#FFFDD0;"| Non-conference Regular Season

|-
! colspan=9 style="background:#960018; color:#FFFDD0;"| Big 12 Regular Season

|-
! colspan=9 style="background:#FFFDD0; color:#960018;"| Big 12 tournament

|-
! colspan=9 style="background:#FFFDD0; color:#960018;"| NCAA tournament

x- Sooner Sports Television (SSTV) is aired locally on Fox Sports. However the contract allows games to air on various affiliates. Those affiliates are FSSW, FSSW+, FSOK, FSOK+, and FCS Atlantic, Central, and Pacific.

See also
2013–14 Oklahoma Sooners men's basketball team

References

External links
Official Athletics Site of the Oklahoma Sooners - Women's Basketball

Oklahoma Sooners women's basketball seasons
Oklahoma
Oklahoma
2013 in sports in Oklahoma
2014 in sports in Oklahoma